Harry E. Johnson (born September 29, 1954, in St. Louis, Missouri, United States) is a career lawyer, entrepreneur, public servant and partner at the Law Office of Glenn and Johnson in Houston, Texas. He served as City Attorney for Kendelton, Texas from 1996 to 1999, and taught at Texas Southern University in both the Thurgood Marshall School of Law and School of Public Affairs from 1994 to 1999. Johnson is a former National President of Alpha Phi Alpha fraternity, and is the President and CEO of the Washington, D.C. Martin Luther King Jr. National Memorial Project Foundation, Inc.

Education
Johnson received his Bachelor of Arts from Xavier University of Louisiana in May 1986 and completed Post Baccalaureate work in Public Administration at St. Louis University from 1981 to 1982. He received his Doctor of Jurisprudence in May 1986 from Texas Southern University's Thurgood Marshall School of Law, where he was a member of the Thurgood Marshall Student Bar Association, Senior Class President, and Phi Alpha Delta President. He also attended Christian Brothers College High School of St. Louis, Missouri.

Presidency of the Martin Luther King Jr. National Memorial Project Foundation, Inc.
Johnson was the President and CEO, from its 2002 establishment, of the Washington, D.C. Martin Luther King Jr. National Memorial Project Foundation, Inc. The President of the United States and the U.S. Congress charged the foundation with erecting a memorial on the National Mall in Washington, D.C. to honor the life and legacy of Martin Luther King Jr. Under Johnson’s leadership, the foundation raised more than $112 million of the original budget of $120 million for the memorial, saving a further $8 million by having the memorial made in China; positioned three boards (Executive Leadership Cabinet, Governing Board and Honorary Board) for the foundation; and garnered support from all living U.S. Presidents, Congress, members of the corporate and nonprofit communities, and celebrities. Johnson oversaw the Memorial through to its dedication on August 28, 2011.

Presidency of Alpha Phi Alpha fraternity
From 2001 to 2004, Johnson served as the 31st National President of Alpha Phi Alpha fraternity. Johnson was not only the youngest person elected to the position of National President in 40 years, but was also elected with the highest margin of any president in 20 years. While in this role, Johnson oversaw over 700 chapters located throughout the United States and abroad; increased the number of chapters in good standing; and was credited with enhancing the national image of the organization with fraternity members, business leaders and political officials.

Distinctions, honors and awards
Johnson has received a number of recognitions for his community involvement and public service, including:

 Trumpet Awards, President’s Award, 2011
 National Service Award, Diplomatic Core, Washington, D.C., 2007
 Trailblazer Award, NAACP, Missouri City Branch, 2004
 One Hundred Black Men, Community Service Award, 2004
 Ebony Magazine, 100 Most Influential Black Americans, 2001–2004
 Fraser Power Networking panelist, 2003
 National Leadership Award, Delta Sigma Theta, 2002
 Ensemble Theater, Father of the Year, 2002
 Congressional Black Caucus Panelist, 2002
 Alumnus of the Year, Thurgood Marshall School of Law, 1995

Community involvement
Johnson has dedicated his time to many community groups and issues, including voter registration, blood donations, birth defects and teenage pregnancy, HIV/AIDS, the National Marrow Donor Program, and the National Blood Drive, Boy Scouts of America and Big Brothers of America.

Additional affiliations
 National Board Member of Big Brothers Big Sisters
 National Member of March of Dimes Volunteer Corps
 State Bar of Texas
 American Bar Association
 National Bar Association
 NAACP, Missouri City Branch
 National Volunteer, Boy Scouts of America
 Texas Trial Lawyers Association
 Houston Trial Lawyers Association
 One Hundred Black Men
 Board Member of the Sam Houston Boy Scouts of America

References

External links
Dedicate the Dream. Dr. Martin Luther King Jr. National Memorial Project Foundation, Inc. Dedication website

1954 births
Living people
Alpha Phi Alpha presidents
Legal educators
Lawyers from St. Louis
Texas lawyers
Texas Southern University alumni
Texas Southern University faculty
Xavier University of Louisiana alumni
Thurgood Marshall School of Law alumni